The Wanted is the debut studio album by British-Irish boy band the Wanted, released on 22 October 2010 through Geffen Records. The majority of the album was written by members of the band, with help from songwriters Steve Mac, Wayne Hector, Ed Drewett, Lucas Secon, Lukas Hilbert and Alexander Kronlund. The album was available in multiple editions, including a deluxe edition exclusive to Tesco, which contained two bonus remixes and two videos, and individual band member editions, exclusive to HMV, which featured a bonus slipcase and liner notes related to the respective band member. The album debuted at number four on the UK Albums Chart, and at number eleven in Ireland. The album produced three singles which attained UK chart success, including the number-one single "All Time Low".

Singles
"All Time Low" was released on 25 July 2010, as the group's debut single. It debuted at number one on the UK Singles Chart. In Ireland, the track peaked at number 13, after four weeks on the chart. Internationally, "All Time Low" was released on 22 October 2010 in Germany, peaking at number 44, and on 1 July 2011 in the United States, peaking at number 19 on the Billboard Hot Club Dance Songs Chart. Its official video currently has over 22 million views on YouTube.

"Heart Vacancy" was released on 17 October 2010, as the group's second single. It peaked at number two on the UK Singles Chart. The track became the band's second top twenty single in Ireland, peaking at number 18. Its video currently has more than ten million views on YouTube. "Heart Vacancy" is currently the band's only single not to be released internationally.

"Lose My Mind" was released on 26 December 2010, as the group's third single. It peaked at number 19 on the UK Singles Chart, but only managed to peak at number 30 in Ireland. The low chart positions may have been caused by the single's release date being brought forward from 13 January 2011 to 26 December 2010. The single was also released in Germany on 4 March 2011, where it peaked at number 36, and it was released in the United States on 31 August 2012, becoming the band's fourth single there. Its video currently has over six million views on YouTube.

Reception

Music Week gave the album a favourable review stating, "This eponymous album sounds like the kind of radio friendly, polished buy playful, and melody-packed album a pop act should make in 2010. It has its moments of innovation – like the vaguely menacing sub bass of 'Say It on the Radio' or the spaghetti western stylings of 'Let's Get Ugly' – but both songs soon resolve into massive choruses that will sounds great coming out of your radios and TVs." Heat Karen Edwards rated the album four out of five, saying "The boys switch lead vocal duties throughout, and from indie ballad 'Golden', the sweet pop sounds of 'Heart Vacancy' and the Kings of Leon-inspired 'Lose My Mind' [...] to the cheeky Midwest style of 'Let's Get Ugly', there are plenty of different sounds to enjoy. [...] There's something for everyone on The Wanted – not just for the teenie-boppers among us." Fraser McAlpine of BBC Music felt the album had plenty of highs and lows, and stated, "There are signs of pop evolution at work within the genes of this lot. [...] Arresting songs, with masses of personality – like the swoony, choral [Hi &] Low, or the downright Wild Beasts-y Golden – sit next to the formulaic (but y’know, fine) Say It on the Radio or Personal Soldier: the very acme of nothing ventured, nothing gained."

Paul Taylor of CityLife said the album is hardly full of surprises and wrote, "Working with Scanda-pop producers Cutfather and Carl Falk and the likes of Steve Mac and Guy Chambers yields a very particular brand of big glossy pop, which manages to sprinkle in a little teen indie spirit as well as a helping of Taio Cruz-style electro. There is, inevitably, a bit of an Eighties feel there." In his review for The Independent, Simon Price wrote: "Their front-loaded debut, penned by the A-list of pop songwriters (Cathy Dennis, Guy Chambers, Taio Cruz), covers all boy band bases, from the Coldplay-meets-Akon smash "All Time Low" to Westlife-esque ballad "Heart Vacancy" and will sell by the truckload to girls who find JLS too scarily urban." 4Music gave the album four out of five stars describing it as "the complete opposite of what we're using to hearing from boybands. [...] there's a few 'lighters in the air' moments, but for the most part it's up-tempo, catchy and [...] credible pop music that you shouldn't feel ashamed for liking." Virgin Media's Ian Gittins gave the album three out of five stars and said the album appealed to "pre-teens and tweenies", and concluded: "No matter how accomplished the packaging, they could not do this if the songs were not in place, and slick confections such as Replace My Heart and Weakness hint that they have located a lucrative musical niche somewhere between JLS and early Justin Timberlake. [...] This is a polished, efficient album of ultra-contemporary pop and R&B, with only the Ennio Morricone-sampling Let's Get Ugly misjudging the cheese levels."

Tour
The Wanted toured the UK in March and April 2011 in support of the album. The band's support acts were Lawson, Twenty Twenty and Starboy Nathan.

Track listing

Charts and certifications

Weekly charts

Year-end charts

Certifications

Release history

References

External links
 Richard Flack Music Production & Recording

2010 debut albums
Geffen Records albums
Albums produced by Cutfather
Albums produced by Greg Kurstin
Albums produced by Rami Yacoub
Albums produced by Steve Mac
The Wanted albums